The raid on Erikli was performed by members of the Kuva-yi Milliye in the Greco-Turkish War. The Malgaç attack had shocked the Greeks, so the members of the Kuva-yi Milliye planned to perform another assault.

Prelude 
In Erikli the Greeks had stationed two companies of an Evzones battalion. The Kuva-yi Milliye planned to lower the morale of the Greek troops by attacking them in Erikli and at the same time boost the resistance feelings of the Turkish population. Another aim was to force Greek troops to pull out of the vicinity of Aydın.

Raid 
The Turkish forces started their attack on the night of 21–22 June 1919. Supported by machine gun fire and the use of their own made hand bombs, they attacked under the cover of darkness. After a two-hour clash and inflicting high casualties on their enemy, the Turkish irregulars retreated back to their positions.

Aftermath 
The Greek units had suffered 30 killed and 40 wounded, while the Turks had seven killed and 10 wounded. Facing more high casualties, the rest of the Greek troops beat a hasty retreat out of Erikli. The raid was protested by the British intelligence officer in Aydın.

References

Sources 
 Oğuz Gülcan, BATI ANADOLU’DA KUVAYI MİLLİYENİN OLUŞUMU (1919–1920), Ankara Üniversitesi Türk İnkılap Tarihi Enstitüsü, 2007, page 254 (Ankara University Open Archive System). 

Erikli
History of Aydın Province
1919 in the Ottoman Empire
1919 in Greece
Conflicts in 1919
Erikli
June 1919 events